Joseph Park Moorer (October 18, 1922 – February 26, 2014) was a vice admiral in the United States Navy. Born in Mount Willing, Alabama, he was the younger brother of Admiral Thomas Hinman Moorer. Joe Moorer graduated from the United States Naval Academy in 1941 and served in the Pacific Theater in World War II and in the Vietnam War. From 1977 to 1980, he served as Commander in Chief of United States Naval Forces Europe, headquartered in London, England. He retired in 1980 and died at his Florida home in 2014.

References

1922 births
2014 deaths
United States Navy personnel of the Vietnam War
United States Navy personnel of World War II
Recipients of the Legion of Merit
United States Navy admirals
United States Naval Academy alumni